David Cook is the first major-label studio album, second overall from seventh season American Idol winner David Cook, released on November 18, 2008, in the United States by RCA Records. It was certified platinum and has sold over one million copies in the United States. It has produced two top twenty singles, "Light On" and "Come Back To Me".  The single "The Time of My Life" has also been certified platinum by the RIAA. "Light On" was certified platinum in January 2010.

Singles
The first single, "Light On", was released to U.S. radio on September 30, 2008. The song sold 109,000 digital downloads in its first week of availability, leading to a number seventeen debut on the Billboard Hot 100 and number eight on the Hot Digital Songs chart. "Light On" was certified platinum in January 2010.

"Come Back to Me" and "Bar-ba-sol" were released as a dual A-side single in March 2009 as the second and third singles, respectively. The video for "Come Back to Me" premiered on American Idol on April 1.

Other singles
On May 20, 2009, Cook performed the song "Permanent" on the finale of American Idol Season 8. This version was released as a digital single, independent of the album promotion, with the proceeds from the song and the video of his performance going to charity. The single version of the song is longer than the version on his album.

"The Time of My Life" (his first feature single as the winner of American Idol) is also featured as a bonus track on the album.

Critical reception
{{Album ratings
|MC=61/100
|rev1 = AllMusic 
|rev1Score = 
|rev2 = Artistdirect 
|rev2Score =  link
|rev3 = Blender
|rev3Score = 
|rev4 = Entertainment Weekly 
|rev4Score = B
|rev5 = Newsday
|rev5Score = B+
|rev6 = Rolling Stone
|rev6Score = 
|rev7 = Us Weekly
|rev7Score =  link
|rev8 = USA Today
|rev8Score = 
|rev9 = TuneLab Music
|rev9Score =  link
}}
The album's reception has been generally mixed to positive. Entertainment Weekly gave the album a positive review saying, "They give David Cook's clutch of bombastic verse-chorus- verse rockers an impressive melodic sheen, one well suited to Cook's husky, expressive vocals. If anything, the series of booming midtempo anthems (most notable among them "Bar-ba-sol" and "Mr. Sensitive") could use a little sandpapering around the edges." AllMusic concurred writing, "He not only is a star thanks to AmIdol, but he's always been ready to do big, happy, crowd-pleasing grunge-pop, as his self-released 2006 debut, Analog Heart, proved. David Cook is remarkably similar to that now-suppressed effort, heavy on crawling, melodic midtempo rockers and power ballads, only given more gloss in its production and writing."Billboard said of the album, "Much like his predecessors' quick-turnaround debuts, Cook's is fairly generic, but its rock edge is dirtied up with crunching guitars and the artist's tuneful growl. There are a host of big, anthemic choruses that highlight the power of Cook's voice, namely the soaring "Declaration" and Chris Cornell/Brian Howes-penned "Light On." Elsewhere, Cook exercises his right to rawk with the swaggering, gritty "Bar-ba-sol" and bares his soul alongside a delicate piano and string arrangement on "Permanent." There are some lyrical missteps ("Life on the Moon," which marvels at the titular concept), but as the lone rocker winner of "Idol" to date, Cook stands apart from cookie-cutter pop."Rolling Stone gave the album an average review commenting on its lack of "out-of-the-box songwriting". Meanwhile, Ken Barnes of USA Today was also subdued in his review, particularly criticizing the production team and the song choices made on the album. Of it, he wrote, "they did him a disservice ... [Cook] has a more supple, versatile voice than Daughtry, and he demonstrated vastly more musical originality than most Idol finalists, but you'd never know it from this collection of formulaic, tune-averse tracks."

Track listing

Personnel
Adapted credits from the album's liner notes.
David Cook - Art direction, guitar, vocals

Musicians
Paul Bushnell - Bass
David Campbell - Strings Arrangement
Rob Cavallo - Additional guitars, keyboard, producer
Dorian Crozier - Drums, Programming
Jamie Muhoberac - Keyboard, organ, piano
Tim Pierce - Guitars
Neal Tiemann  - Guitars

Production
Keith Armstrong - Additional Pro Tools, assistant engineer
Tyler Dragness - Guitar Tech
Mike Fansano - Drum Tech
Erwin Gorostiza - Art Direction
Ted Jensen - Mastering
Chris Lord - Mixing
Doug McKean- Engineer
Chris Feldmann - Art Direction, design
Lars Fox - Additional Pro Tools

Cheryl Jenets - Production coordination
Nik Karpen - Additional Pro Tools, assistant engineer
Jamie Neely - Production assistant
Frank Ockenfels - Photographer
Steve Rea - Assistant engineer
Steve Salas - Musical direction
Emerson Wahl -Studio assistant
Seth Waldmann - Assistant engineer
Russ Waugh - Studio assistant

Release history

Chart performance
The album debuted at the number-three spot on the Billboard 200 chart with sales of 280,000 copies in the United States. In the beginning of February 2009, it was announced that the album had been certified platinum by RIAA for shipment of 1,000,000 copies.  The album also broke digital sales records for a debut artist, selling 59,000 electronic copies.  The album has sold over 1,500,000 copies worldwide.

Sales and certifications

Notes
 The song "A Daily AntheM" was featured on the eighth season of American Idol'' during the audition episodes.
 The song "Heroes" was featured on the commercial for the FIFA World Cup and when he was on Extreme Makeover: Home Edition while he was coming off the bus. It was also used as the soundtrack for NBC Sports Championship Season promos in 2010 for: The Kentucky Derby (May), The Players (May), The Preakness Stakes (May), The French Open (June), The Stanley Cup Final (June), US Open (June), and Wimbledon (July).

References

External links
 Official website

2008 albums
Albums produced by Rob Cavallo
David Cook (singer) albums
RCA Records albums
19 Recordings albums